Mecham is a surname. Notable people with the surname include:

Evan Mecham, Governor of Arizona 1987-1988
George Mecham, British naval officer who participated in the search for Franklin's lost expedition
Leonidas Ralph Mecham, Director of the Administrative Office of the United States Courts, 1985-2006
William Mecham, British cartoonist and performer as Tom Merry (1853-1902)

See also
Mechem
Meacham